Misilyata is a rural locality (a village) in Klyapovskoye Rural Settlement, Beryozovsky District, Perm Krai, Russia. The population was 24 as of 2010.

Geography 
Misilyata is located 26 km east of  Beryozovka (the district's administrative centre) by road. Demidyata is the nearest rural locality.

References 

Rural localities in Beryozovsky District, Perm Krai